Ipoteşti may refer to:

Ipotești, Olt, a commune in Olt County, Romania
Ipotești, Suceava, a commune in Suceava County, Romania
Ipoteşti, a village in Mihai Eminescu Commune, Botoşani County, Romania